West is a city in McLennan County, Texas, United States. As of the 2020 census, the city population was 2,531. It is named after Thomas West, the first postmaster of the city.

Despite its name, the city is not located within the region of West Texas; area residents sometimes call the community "West comma Texas" to avoid repetition.

 it has one of the largest concentrations of Czech Texans of any city in the state.

History
The first settlers of northern McLennan County arrived in the 1840s. They were farm and ranch families drawn from the east by the rich lands made available by the government sale of land to build schools in Texas. The area farmers cultivated the land and grew cotton, wheat, and grain sorghum, and raised cattle. The farming community centered around a freshwater spring that became known as Bold Springs. In 1860, Bold Springs had a population of about 300 and provided services such as a blacksmith, churches, and a post office.

The Missouri–Kansas–Texas Railroad was laid between Hillsboro and Waco in the fall of 1881. The path of the railroad passed through land owned by Thomas West, who had moved to the area in 1859. He farmed land that he had purchased and served as postmaster of Bold Springs. A train depot and station was built on the land he sold to the railroad company and the land running beside the tracks was divided into small sections and sold to people wanting to start businesses. The new depot and station included a post office and since Mr. West served as postmaster the settlement became known as West's Station, later West Station, and finally its current name West. Mr. West opened the first general store and became a successful businessman as he later owned a hotel, a furniture store, and a bank.

The railroad brought prosperity to the area during the 1880s. More businesses were opened and more surrounding land was purchased. Czech immigrants came to the area, purchasing the rich lands to farm and start a fresh life in the new world. They also opened businesses, sharing their European culture. By the 1890s, the Czech businesses flourished in West. On June 11, 1892, West was officially organized into a town. It had become the center of commerce for the area. There were cotton gins, grocery stores, churches, schools, and doctors' offices.

The temporary city Crush, Texas, located just three miles (5 km) south of West, was the location of The Crash at Crush, a head-on collision between two locomotives that was staged on September 15, 1896, as a publicity stunt for the Missouri–Kansas–Texas Railroad. Over 30,000 spectators gathered at the crash site, named "crush" for MKT passenger agent William Crush, who conceived the idea. About 4 p.m. the trains were sent speeding toward each other. Contrary to mechanics' predictions, the steam boilers exploded on impact, propelling pieces of metal into the crowd. Two people were killed and many others injured, including Jarvis Deane of Waco, who was photographing the event and lost an eye. Texas Historical Marker 5315, located on Interstate 35 northbound frontage road, between Mangrum and Wiggins Road, commemorates the event.

The turn of the century brought electricity, running water, and natural gas. The population of West and surrounding area grew.  Many of the descendants of the original settlers continue to farm the lands and run the businesses today. Czech is still spoken by some of the older residents.

2013 explosion
 

On April 17, 2013, a fire broke out at West Fertilizer Co., a fertilizer plant on the north side of town that stored ammonium nitrate, a fertilizer that can be used as an explosive. The fire triggered two explosions milliseconds apart from one another. The massive blast killed 15 people, including 12 first responders, and injured at least 200. It destroyed nearby schools, an apartment complex, and a nursing home and damaged hundreds of homes in the surrounding area.

The explosion, which measured as a 2.1 magnitude earthquake, garnered much media attention. President Barack Obama and Texas Gov. Rick Perry attended the memorial for first responders.

A month-long investigation ruled the cause of the explosion undetermined because multiple possible causes could not be ruled out. The lingering possibilities include arson, an electrical glitch or a golf cart that overheated.

It was later concluded that the reason for the April 17, 2013 blast was a fire that accidentally ignited inside, causing the fertilizer plant to explode.

In 2016 the Bureau of Alcohol, Tobacco, Firearms and Explosives concluded that the fire that caused the explosion was set deliberately. However ATF never presented any evidence of arson. A comprehensive investigation by the U.S. Chemical Safety and Hazard Investigation Board (CSB) publicized in 2016 did not find any evidence of foul play. The causes of the explosion and recommendations for prevention can be found in www.CSB.gov under West Fertilizer Company (Completed Investigations).

Geography

West is located at  (31.803369, –97.093106). Most of the city is located on the east side of Interstate 35.

Climate

The climate in this area is characterized by hot, humid summers and generally mild to cool winters.  According to the Köppen Climate Classification system, West has a humid subtropical climate, abbreviated "Cfa" on climate maps.

Demographics

As of the 2020 United States census, there were 2,531 people, 1,015 households, and 635 families residing in the city.

As of the census of 2010, 2,807 people, 1,045 households, and 698 families resided in the city. The population density was 1,754.3 people per square mile (701.7/km). There were 1,219 housing units at an average density of 761.8 per square mile (304.7/km). The racial makeup of the city was 89.0% White, 3.9% African American, 0.9% Native American, 0.2% Asian, 6.9% from other and two or more races. Hispanics or Latinos of any race were 13.8% of the population.  The majority of the White population is of Czech descent (and West was officially designated "Home of the Official Kolache of the Texas Legislature" in 1997).

Of the 1,045 households, 35.6% had children under the age of 18 living with them, 45.6% were married couples living together, 15.0% had a female householder with no husband present, and 34.9% were non family households. About 31.7% of all households were made up of individuals living alone, and 33.0% were households with an individual who was 65 years of age or older. The average household size was 2.45 and the average family size was 3.1.

In the city, the population was distributed as 28.3% of those who are 19 years and younger, 10.8% from 20 to 29, 25.0% from 30 to 49, 14.8% from 50 to 64, and 21.0% who were 65 years of age or older.  The median age was 38.9 years.  West has a 53% female and 47% male population.

The median income for a household in the city was $35,929, and for a family was $44,485. Males had a median income of $31,055 versus $27,917 for females. The per capita income for the city was $18,850. About 13.8% of families and 18.3% of the population were below the poverty line, including 28.0% of those under age 18 and 13.9% of those age 65 or over.

It is part of the Waco Metropolitan Statistical Area.

Area events

Westfest is a festival celebrating the city's large Czech population and their heritage.  There are several bakeries (such as the Czech Stop and Little Czech Bakery) and a nearby hotel named The Czech Inn.

Education
The city of West is served by the West Independent School District, and is home to the West High School Trojans.

Infrastructure
Interstate 35 and Union Pacific Railroad pass through the city.

Notable people

 Cliff Bartosh, former left-handed relief pitcher in Major League Baseball who played for the Cleveland Indians and Chicago Cubs
 Finis A. Brown, Los Angeles Police Detective Sergeant, lead investigator for L.A.P.D. in the infamous and unsolved 1947 "Black Dahlia" murder case
 Buster Chatham, baseball player
 Joe Eisma, comic book artist for Image Comics, DC Comics, and Archie Comics
 Ray Kubala, American football player
 Scott Podsednik, Major League Baseball outfielder who played in the 2005 World Series championship Chicago White Sox team
 James "Slim" Hand, country-western artist, performer and actor

Gallery

See also

 Operation Last Call

References

External links

 City of West

 
Cities in Texas
Czech-American culture in Texas
Ethnic enclaves in Texas
Czech communities in the United States
Cities in McLennan County, Texas
Populated places established in 1881
1881 establishments in Texas